Elephant Hill is a hill northernmost summit in the Puente Hills of Los Angeles County, California.

There is also an Elephant Hill in the El Sereno area of Los Angeles.

References

Puente Hills